Zamia poeppigiana is a species of plant in the family Zamiaceae. It is found in Colombia, Ecuador, and Peru. It is threatened by habitat loss.

References

poeppigiana
Near threatened plants
Taxonomy articles created by Polbot